An integrated resort (IR) is a major resort property that includes a hotel with a casino, together with convention facilities, entertainment shows, theme parks, luxury retail and fine dining. The term is largely Singaporean.

Earlier IR licenses were awarded to Marina Bay Sands and Resorts World Sentosa, which both began operations in early 2010, and were by 2013 the most profitable casinos in the world. Since then, the term has been adopted by the hospitality industry for global use.

History

In 1923, gambling was briefly legalized in the then-British colony of Singapore, but the experiment led to gambling addiction and increased crime, and gambling was criminalised again within three years.

In the following decades, the operation of legal gambling in Singapore was limited to the government-run Singapore Pools for lotteries, and Singapore Turf Club for horse racing. However, during a parliament session on 18 April 2005, Lee Hsien Loong, the prime minister of Singapore, announced the cabinet's decision to develop two casinos and associated hotels and malls in Marina South and Sentosa.

The government stated that the aim of the project was to boost Singapore's tourism industry which had been facing intense competition from other destinations around the region, particularly from nearby Bangkok and Hong Kong, which has since also considered legalisation of casinos in the wake of initiatives in Singapore. Even closer to home, Malaysia has long had a legal casino cum theme park on Genting Highlands, which proved popular with Singaporean tourists. The IRs in Singapore were expected to create about 35,000 jobs directly and indirectly. In addition to the casinos, the IRs will have other amenities including hotels, restaurants, shopping and convention centers, theatres, museums and theme parks. The industry was expected to invest US$7.1 billion in integrated resorts (US$3.5 billion in Marina Bay; US$3.6 billion in Resorts World).

Public debate and criticisms

The plan to build the integrated resorts was subject to considerable debate among Singaporeans even till 2014. Several groups, such as those belonging to the Muslim and Christian communities as well as social workers, openly expressed their disapproval of the casinos. Concerns were raised about the negative social impact of casino gambling, citing worries that the casinos could encourage more gambling and increase the risk of compulsive gambling. Activist groups argued that a casino could also lead to undesirable activities often associated with gambling, including money laundering, loan sharks or even organised crime.

Lee acknowledged the downsides of having integrated resorts and the concerns expressed by the public. He promised that there would be safeguards to limit the social impact of casino gambling. He stated there would be restrictions on the admission of local people into the casinos, for example, family members of a patron of the casino may block him or her from entering and gambling. Lee announced a steep entrance fee of S$100 per entry or S$2,000 per year and a system of exclusions for all Singaporeans. (Increased to $150 per entry or $3,000 per year on 4 April 2019) In addition, the casinos would not be allowed to extend credit to the local population.

Lee, who has been prime minister since August 2004, took a significant political risk when he made the decision, with some of his cabinet members against the plan. Nonetheless, Lee decided to go ahead with the decision; he stated:

The six-month consultative period gave the opportunity for many sections of the population to voice their opposition to the casinos, including a petition that attracted tens of thousands of signatures. When Lee approved the proposal after such widespread criticism, the opposition said that he had overruled consensus.

The debate over integrated resorts also brought to the public's attention a discussion on the methods and ways government policies should be deliberated in Singapore, and whether they were effective or needed reform. This is especially because the political climate is dominated by the People's Action Party. Low Thia Khiang, the leader of the opposition Workers' Party, warned in a parliament session:

By the time of the 2006 general elections, however, the decision was already a fait accompli, and the opposition parties made little mention of it. The issue of casinos in Singapore was brought up by parliamentary members such as Denise Phua suggesting that the place of gambling in Singapore be reviewed till putting in a total ban on remote gambling after the Remote Gambling Bill was passed.

Development

Marina Bay
In December 2004, the government of Singapore called for a request-for-concept (RFC), inviting industry players to submit concept proposals for the integrated resorts. A total of 19 bids were submitted during the RFC.

Four companies/consortia placed formal bids for the Marina Bay site:
Genting International/Star Cruises
Harrah's Entertainment/Keppel Land
Las Vegas Sands
MGM Mirage/CapitaLand

While Harrah's and MGM were considered forerunners, Las Vegas Sands emerged as the surprise winner when it was announced on 26 May 2006. Las Vegas Sands had committed the highest development investment of S$3.85 billion. With the land price and associated capital cost, its total investment will exceed S$5 billion.
It would also be one of the most expensive casinos in the world. The design by Moshe Safdie consists of three large shells containing conference halls and other business venues, three large hotel towers linked on their top floors by a sweeping sky garden, and a centerpiece museum which juts out onto the bay.

Marina Bay Sands officially launched the opening of its first phase developments on 27 April 2010 and held its official grand opening celebrations on 23 June 2010. It is billed as a centrepiece of the Marina Bay landscape. Amenities include a hotel with 2,560 rooms and suites, Sands Expo and Convention Center with dining and shopping facilities, and the Sands SkyPark at Level 57 of the hotel, which features a 150-metre long infinity-edge swimming pool. The Expo and Convention Center served as the main media center for the inaugural Youth Olympic Games 2010 held in Singapore in August 2010. Other facilities such as museums, theatres and crystal pavilions are due to open over the year through till 2011.

Sentosa
Three consortia submitted their proposals by the due date on 10 October 2006, including:
Eighth Wonder with Publishing and Broadcasting Limited, Melco International Development, Isle of Capri Casinos (design by Peter Marino)
Genting International with Star Cruises, Universal Studios (design by Michael Graves)
Kerzner International with Capitaland (design by Frank Gehry)

A fourth contender, a Harrah's Entertainment and Keppel Land consortium, pulled out from the race four days before the deadline.

The bids were reviewed by a ministerial committee and a tender evaluation committee. The ministerial committee was headed by Deputy Prime Minister Prof S Jayakumar and included Tharman Shanmugaratnam, S Iswaran, Mah Bow Tan, Lim Hng Kiang, Dr Vivian Balakrishnan and Raymond Lim as its members.

Results were announced on 8 December 2006. The winning consortium was front-runner Genting International and Star Cruises with their bid for the Resorts World Sentosa.

Australia

In August 2018, the Queensland government is set to invite investors to register their interest in developing an Integrated Resort Development in the Gold Coast. This comes after a proposed development on the Gold Coast Spit was ended on 1 August 2017.

Cyprus

The City of Dreams Mediterranean, developed by the Integrated Casino Resorts Cyprus Consortium, will be the first integrated resort on Cyprus. It is expected to launch in 2021.

Japan

On 20 July 2018, the Japanese Diet passed a bill allowing the establishment of casinos in three Japanese cities. Under the Integrated Resort Implementation Law, "the casinos will be embedded in family-friendly resorts, partly in a bid to counter their seedy image"; customers are limited to three visits a week; and locals will have to pay an entrance charge of ¥6000, while foreigners can enter for free. The bill "clearly takes a leaf from Singapore's book".

Philippines
In 2007, the Philippine Amusement & Gaming Corporation (PAGCOR) opened Entertainment City by the Manila Bay to four integrated resorts.

Sri Lanka
Cinnamon Life Colombo is Sri Lanka's first integrated resort. The resort is consist of 800 room hotel, 47-storeyed resident tower and convention center with 5,000 seating capacity.

See also
National Council on Problem Gambling (Singapore)

References

External links

Developing Industries: Integrated Resorts of the Ministry of Trade and Industry (Singapore)
The Integrated Resorts: A Select Guide (English Version), https://web.archive.org/web/20100131073158/http://libguides.nl.sg/integratedresort – Singapore National Library Board (NLB) NLS Resource Guides

Singapore government policies
Tourism in Singapore
2005 in Singapore
2006 in Singapore